Fadel Shana'a (27 March 1984 – 16 April 2008) was a Palestinian journalist working as a cameraman for Reuters. He was killed, along with eight bystanders (aged 12 to 20) by a flechette shell fired by an Israeli tank in the Gaza Strip (the 2008 Bureij killings).

Shana'a's video footage shows the tank firing and a glimpse of the incoming shell before going black at the moment of impact. The then Reuters Editor-in-chief David Schlesinger called for an investigation, as did Human Rights Watch, whose Middle East director stated that "Israeli soldiers did not make sure they were aiming at a military target before firing, and there is evidence suggesting they actually targeted the journalists." The Al Mezan Center for Human Rights denounced the killing as a deliberate war crime.

The Israel Defense Forces (IDF) released a statement saying: "The IDF wishes to emphasize that unlike terrorist organizations, not only does it not deliberately target uninvolved civilians, it also uses means to avoid such incidents... Reports claiming the opposite are false and misleading." On 13 August 2008, it was reported that the IDF had closed an investigation into the death of Shana'a without taking disciplinary action against the tank crew that killed him. In a letter sent to Reuters, then Chief Military Advocate General, Avichai Mandelblit, said: "In light of the reasonable conclusion reached by the tank crew and its superiors, that the characters were hostile and were carrying an object most likely to be a weapon, the decision to fire at the targets ... was sound." David Schlesinger said: "I'm extremely disappointed that this report condones a disproportionate use of deadly force in a situation the army itself admitted had not been analysed clearly." He added: "They would appear to take the view that any raising of a camera into position could garner a deadly response." In a statement issued at its London headquarters, Reuters said the army probe could effectively give soldiers a "free hand to kill", without being sure of the identity of their targets.

Thousands attended the funeral of Shana'a in Gaza.

See also
 Media coverage of the Arab–Israeli conflict
 List of journalists killed during the Israeli-Palestinian conflict

References

External links

Assassinated Palestinian journalists
Journalists killed while covering the Israeli–Palestinian conflict
1984 births
2008 deaths
Filmed killings